The 2016 Major League Baseball postseason was the playoff tournament of Major League Baseball for the 2016 season. The winners of the League Division Series would move on to the League Championship Series to determine the pennant winners that face each other in the World Series.

In the American League, the Toronto Blue Jays and Texas Rangers made their second straight postseason appearances respectively, the Cleveland Indians and Boston Red Sox made their second postseason appearances in the past four years, and the Baltimore Orioles made their third appearance in the past five years.

In the National League, the San Francisco Giants made their fourth appearance in seven years, the Washington Nationals made their third appearance in the past five years, the Chicago Cubs and New York Mets returned for the second year in a row, and the Los Angeles Dodgers returned for the fourth straight time.

The postseason began on October 4, and ended on November 2, with the Cubs defeating the Indians in seven games in the 2016 World Series. It was the Cubs' first title in 108 years, ending the longest championship drought in North American sports history, as well as the Curse of the Billy Goat.

Playoff seeds
The following teams qualified for the postseason:

American League
 Texas Rangers – AL West champions, 95–67
 Cleveland Indians – AL Central champions, 94–67
 Boston Red Sox – AL East champions, 93–69
 Toronto Blue Jays – 89–73 (10–9 head-to-head record vs. BAL)
 Baltimore Orioles – 89–73 (9–10 head-to-head record vs. TOR)

National League
 Chicago Cubs – NL Central champions, 103–58
 Washington Nationals – NL East champions, 95–67
 Los Angeles Dodgers – NL West champions, 91–71
 New York Mets – 87–75 (4–3 head-to-head record vs. SF)
 San Francisco Giants – 87–75 (3–4 head-to-head record vs. NYM)

Playoff bracket

American League Wild Card

(4) Toronto Blue Jays vs. (5) Baltimore Orioles 

The Blue Jays defeated the Orioles, 5–2, in the 11th inning, when Edwin Encarnación hit a walk-off three-run home run off Ubaldo Jiménez. The Blue Jays returned to the ALDS for the second year in a row.

As of 2022, this is the last postseason appearance by the Orioles.

National League Wild Card

(4) New York Mets vs. (5) San Francisco Giants 

This was the second postseason meeting between the Mets and Giants, with the last being the 2000 NLDS (won by the Mets). The Giants won 3-0 after a 3-run home run by Conor Gillaspie in the top of the ninth inning.

The Mets would not return to the postseason again until 2022.

American League Division Series

(1) Texas Rangers vs. (4) Toronto Blue Jays 

This was the second straight postseason meeting between the Blue Jays and Rangers. The Blue Jays once again emerged victorious, sweeping the Rangers to advance to the ALCS for the second year in a row. In Arlington, the Blue Jays blew out the Rangers in Game 1, and then won Game 2 by a 5-3 score to go up 2-0 in the series headed back to Toronto. The Blue Jays took Game 3 in extra innings, capped off by an error made by Texas' Rougned Odor while attempting a double play - the throw went wide of first baseman Mitch Moreland, which allowed Toronto's Josh Donaldson to run to home plate and clinch the series win for the Blue Jays.

This is the last postseason series win by the Blue Jays, as well as the last postseason series ever played at Globe Life Park.

As of 2022, this is the last postseason appearance by the Rangers.

(2) Cleveland Indians vs. (3) Boston Red Sox 

This was the fifth postseason meeting between the Red Sox and Indians. The Indians won in 1995 and 1998, while the Red Sox won in 1999 and 2007. The Indians swept the Red Sox to return to the ALCS for the first time since 2007.

The Indians narrowly took Game 1 by holding off a late Red Sox rally. In Game 2, the Indians shut out the Red Sox, 6-0, thanks to a solid pitching performance from Corey Kluber. When the series shifted to Boston for Game 3, the Tribe struck first with an early lead which they did not relinquish, and closed out the series.

With the win, the Indians improved their postseason record against the Red Sox to 3-2, winning in 1995, 1998, and 2016. The Red Sox returned to the postseason the next year, but were defeated by the Houston Astros in four games in the ALDS.

National League Division Series

(1) Chicago Cubs vs. (5) San Francisco Giants 

This was the second postseason meeting between the Cubs and Giants. Their last meeting was in the 1989 NLCS, which the Giants won in five games. The Cubs defeated the Giants in four games to advance to the NLCS for the second year in a row. The Cubs prevailed in a 1-0 shutout in Game 1, and took Game 2 by three runs to go up 2-0 in the series headed to San Francisco. The Giants narrowly prevailed in an ugly 13-inning Game 3 to avoid a sweep, however the Cubs would close out the series with a 6-5 win in Game 4.

The Giants were denied a fourth World Series title, officially ending their dynasty. The Giants would not return to the postseason again until 2021.

(2) Washington Nationals vs. (3) Los Angeles Dodgers 

This was the first postseason meeting between these two teams since the 1981 NLCS, back when the Nationals were then known as the Montreal Expos. The Dodgers defeated the Nationals in five games to return to the NLCS for the first time since 2013.

Both teams would meet again in the 2019 NLDS, which the Nationals won.

American League Championship Series

(2) Cleveland Indians vs. (4) Toronto Blue Jays 

The Indians defeated the Blue Jays in five games to return to the World Series for the first time since 1997. The Indians narrowly took Games 1 and 2 in Cleveland, and when the series shifted to Toronto, they went up 3-0 in the series with a 4-2 win in Game 3. The Blue Jays took Game 4 by four runs to avoid a sweep, however the Indians would close out the series with a 3-0 shutout in Game 5.

The Indians set an MLB record with the lowest batting average by a winning team in a postseason series, hitting just .168 against the Blue Jays. They also became the first club to win the AL pennant on the road since the Chicago White Sox did so at Angel Stadium in 2005. As of 2023, this is the last time the Indians won the AL pennant.

The 2016 ALCS was part of a streak of success for Cleveland-based teams against their Toronto counterparts, as the NBA’s Cleveland Cavaliers also defeated the Toronto Raptors in the NBA Playoffs in 2016, 2017, and 2018.

National League Championship Series

(1) Chicago Cubs vs. (3) Los Angeles Dodgers 

This was the second postseason meeting between the Cubs and Dodgers. They had last met in the 2008 NLDS, which the Dodgers won in a sweep. The Cubs defeated the Dodgers in six games, advancing to the World Series for the first time since 1945.

Both teams split the first two games in Chicago. When the series shifted to Los Angeles for Game 3, the Dodgers shut out the Cubs by a 6-0 score to go up 2-1 in the series. The Cubs blew out the Dodgers in Game 4 to even the series, and then took Game 5 by an 8-4 score to go up 3-2 in the series headed back home. In Game 6, the Cubs shut out the Dodgers, 5-0, to end their long pennant drought and return to the World Series.

As of 2023, this is the last time the Cubs won the NL pennant. Even so, they no longer hold the longest pennant drought in the MLB, as with their win over the Dodgers, the Seattle Mariners, who have yet to win a pennant since their inception in 1977, now hold the longest pennant drought. The team with the longest pennant drought in the National League now became the Pittsburgh Pirates, who last won it in 1979.

Both teams would meet again in the NLCS the next year, which the Dodgers won in five games.

2016 World Series

(AL2) Cleveland Indians vs. (NL1) Chicago Cubs 

This World Series featured the two teams with the longest championship droughts in the league - the Cubs' last championship came in 1908, while the Indians' last title was in 1948. In what is considered by many to be one of the greatest World Series ever played, the Cubs defeated the Indians in seven games to win their first title in 108 years, officially ending the Curse of the Billy Goat. The Cubs became the sixth team in World Series history to overcome a 3–1 series deficit to win the title, and the first team to do so since the Kansas City Royals in 1985. 

In Cleveland, the Indians took Game 1 in a 6-0 shutout, while in Game 2, the Cubs prevailed by a 5-1 score to win their first World Series game since 1945 and even the series headed back to Chicago. In the first World Series game played at Wrigley Field since 1945, the Indians, with help from four pitchers - Josh Tomlin, Andrew Miller, Bryan Shaw, and Cody Allen, shut out the Cubs by a 1-0 score to take a 2-1 series lead. The Indians then took Game 4 by a 7-2 score to go up 3-1 in the series. In Game 5, the Cubs prevailed by a 3-2 score thanks to excellent pitching performances from Jon Lester and Aroldis Chapman to win their first home World Series game since 1945 and send the series back to Cleveland. In Game 6, the Cubs blew out the Indians, 9-3, to force a seventh game, and also made National League history as Jake Arrieta became the first NL starting pitcher to win two road games in a single World Series since Bob Gibson in 1967. 

Game 7 was the most notable contest of the series - the Indians, thanks to a 2-run home run from Rajai Davis, tied the game at six runs a piece. The game went into extra innings, and was then hit with a rain delay for 17 minutes. The Cubs then scored two runs in the top of the tenth. The Indians scored one more run in the bottom of the tenth to cut the Cubs' lead to one, but Kris Bryant picked up an infield ground ball and threw it to Anthony Rizzo, securing the title for the Cubs.

The Cubs' victory was the first World Series title for Chicago since 2005, when the Chicago White Sox swept the Houston Astros to end the Curse of the Black Sox. This marked the first time that the Cubs had won the World Series while playing at Wrigley Field. As of 2022, this is the last time that a team from either Ohio or Illinois appeared in the World Series.

After the loss, the Indians now became the team with the longest World Series title drought, which stood at 68 years, and is now 75 years.

References

External links
 League Baseball Standings & Expanded Standings - 2016

 
Major League Baseball postseason